The Prophets of Eternal Fjord is a 2012 novel by Danish-Norwegian author Kim Leine. It won the Nordic Council's Literature Prize in 2013 and was shortlisted for the 2017 International Dublin Literary Award.

References

2012 Danish novels
Danish-language novels
Nordic Council's Literature Prize-winning works
Novels set in Greenland
Novels set in the 18th century
Danish historical novels
Gyldendal books